Lepidosaphes is a genus of scales and mealybugs in the family Diaspididae. There are at least 150 described species in Lepidosaphes.

See also
 List of Lepidosaphes species

References

Further reading

 
 
 
 

Lepidosaphidini
Sternorrhyncha genera